The 1992 Montana State Bobcats football team was an American football team that represented Montana State University in the Big Sky Conference (Big Sky) during the 1992 NCAA Division I-AA football season. In their first season under head coach Cliff Hysell, the Bobcats compiled a 4–7 record (3–5 against Big Sky opponents) and finished fifth out of nine teams in the Big Sky.

Schedule

References

Montana State
Montana State Bobcats football seasons
Montana State Bobcats football